The 1938 United States Senate election in North Carolina was held on November 7, 1938. Incumbent Democratic Senator Robert Rice Reynolds was re-elected to a second term in office, defeating U.S. Representative Franklin Wills Hancock Jr. in the Democratic primary and Republican former U.S. Representative Charles A. Jonas in the general election.

Democratic primary

Candidates
Franklin Wills Hancock Jr., U.S. Representative from Oxford
Robert Rice Reynolds, incumbent Senator since 1933

Results

General election

Results

Footnotes

1938
North C
1938 North Carolina elections